Rhode Island wine refers to wine made from grapes grown in the U.S. state of Rhode Island. Viticulture in Rhode Island began in 1663 when King Charles II of England included wine production among the land uses approved in the royal charter establishing Rhode Island as an English colony.  The modern wine industry of Rhode Island began in 1975 when Sakonnet Vineyards was established near Little Compton.  Located near the Atlantic Ocean, Rhode Island has one of the most moderate climates of the U.S. northeast.

See also

 American wine
 List of wineries in New England

References

 
Wine regions of the United States by state
1663 establishments in Rhode Island